Very Short Introductions (VSI) is a book series published by the Oxford University Press (OUP). The books are concise introductions to particular subjects, intended for a general audience but written by experts. Most are under 200 pages long. While authors may present personal viewpoints, the books are meant to be "balanced and complete" as well as thought provoking.

The series began in 1995, and by April 2018 there were 607 titles, published or announced. The books have been commercially successful, and have been published in more than 25 languages. Institutions can subscribe to an online service to allow their users to read the books.

Most of the books have been written specifically for the series, but around 60 were recycled from earlier OUP publications: several had been in OUP's Past Masters series, and numbers 17–24 used chapters from The Oxford Illustrated History of Britain (1984).

Each book of the series is numbered on its spine. These numbers broadly, but not exactly, correspond with the publication dates.

Reception
Writing in the 'New Yorker in 2017, Kathryn Schulz praised the diversity of topics covered but noted significant gaps in coverage, including an absence of women and people of colour in its 54 biographies and "a British bias in the choice of subjects". Schulz also described the quality of the books as variable, favourably comparing the books written about Teeth, Deserts and Robotics against those written on Mountains, Home and Archaeology.

In the Fortnightly Review, Michelene Wandor said that the series "successfully bridged the gap between academic and trade publishing" and reviewed six volumes.

List of books in the series

Boxed sets
Six boxed sets, each with a different theme, were released in 2006. Five books from the series on the given theme were included, plus the series' promotional volume A Very Short Introduction to Everything.
 The Ballot Box
 Politics (008)
 Capitalism (108)
 Democracy (075)
 Socialism (126)
 Fascism (077)
 The Brain Box
 Evolution (100)
 Consciousness (121)
 Intelligence (039)
 Cosmology (051)
 Quantum Theory (069)
 The Thought Box
 Hegel (049)
 Marx (028)
 Nietzsche (034)
 Schopenhauer (062)
 Kierkegaard (058)
 The Basics Box
 Philosophy (055)
 Mathematics (066)
 History (016)
 Politics (008)
 Psychology (006)
 The Boom Box
 Ancient Warfare (117)
 Cold War (087)
 Crusades (140)
 French Revolution (054)
 Spanish Civil War (123)
 The Picture Box
 Art History (102)
 Renaissance Art (129)
 Modern Art (120)
 Architecture (072)
 Design (136)

Design
The body text is set in Miller in some books, and others are set in OUP Argo; the front page title (and other book titles within the book) is set in Lithos; the sans-serif used for headings and in other places is OUP Argo.

See also
Découvertes Gallimard, a similar series in French of introductory books written by experts, started in 1986, noted for its fine illustration. Some titles are translated in other languages.
For Dummies, a similar series of introductory books.
Que sais-je?, a similar series in French of introductory books written by experts, started in 1941. Some titles are translated in other languages. 
Rough Guides, whose non-travel books also cover culture and science.

Notes

References

External links
 Official site

British non-fiction books
Lists of books
Oxford University Press books
Publications established in 2000
Series of non-fiction books